Robert E. "Rob" Meyerson is an American aerospace engineer and executive known for his role in the development of reusable rocket launch systems.

Meyerson is the founder of Delalune Space, a management consulting firm providing advisory services to the aerospace, mobility, technology, and financial sectors. He is currently an Operating Partner at C5 Capital, the executive producer for AIAA ASCEND, and a board director or advisor to numerous organizations.

He is the former president of Blue Origin.

Career

Delalune Space 
Meyerson is the founder and CEO of Delalune Space, a management consulting firm providing advisory services to the aerospace, mobility, technology, and financial sectors. He is also an operating partner at C5 Capital, executive producer for AIAA ASCEND, and board director or advisor to numerous organizations.

Axiom Space 
In 2021, it was announced that Meyerson, an operating partner at C5 and former Blue Origin president, would be joining Axiom's board of directors and that Axiom Space had raised $130m in a new round of funding.

Meyerson stated that Axiom Space is a force in the space sector, and it would become a centrepiece of the C5 Capital portfolio and enhance the vision for a secure global future.

Blue Origin 
Meyerson joined Blue Origin in 2003 as program manager later becoming the first company president. Working with company founder Jeff Bezos, Meyerson grew the company from 10 to 1500 people. Under Meyerson's leadership, Blue Origin developed the New Shepard system for suborbital human and research flights, and the New Glenn system for orbital human and research flights, as well as the manufacturing and test capabilities that enable these programs.  He also developed Blue Origin into a liquid rocket engine supplier, creating and selling the BE-3 LOX/LH2 rocket engine and the BE-4 LOX/LNG rocket engine to other companies.

From January to November 2018, Meyerson was the senior vice-president in charge of the Advanced Development Programs business unit.

Kistler Aerospace and NASA 
Before joining Blue Origin Meyerson was a senior manager at Kistler Aerospace Corporation responsible for the development of the K-1 reusable launch vehicle, the landing, and thermal protection systems of a two-stage reusable launch vehicle, as well as all technical activities related to Kistler's Space Launch Initiative contract with NASA’s Marshall Space Flight Center.

Meyerson launched his career as an aerospace engineer at NASA Johnson Space Center (JSC) from 1985 to 1997 working [3] on human spaceflight systems, including the aerodynamic design of the Space Shuttle orbiter drag parachute, as well as the overall design, integration, and flight test of a gliding parachute for the X-38 Crew Rescue Vehicle, a crew return vehicle designed to return astronauts to earth from the International Space Station. Meyerson began with NASA in 1985 as a cooperative education student at JSC.

Personal, education, and awards
Originally from Southfield, Michigan, a suburb of Detroit, Meyerson earned a B.S. in aerospace engineering from the University of Michigan and a master's degree in engineering management from the University of Houston.

Meyerson has been a long-time advocate for outreach programs that provide work experience and sponsors Blue's internship program, which has inspired and encouraged many university-level students to pursue careers in the aerospace industry. In December 2016, Meyerson gave the commencement speech at Embry Riddle Aeronautical University.

He is a trustee at the Museum of Flight in Seattle, a former member of the board of the Commercial Spaceflight Federation, and is a member of the Leadership Advisory Board for the College of Engineering at the University of Michigan and a member of the Visiting Committee for the Aeronautics & Astronautics Department at the University of Washington.

He is an AIAA Fellow, and a former member of the Aerodynamic Decelerator Systems Technical Committee. He was awarded the Space Flight Award by the American Astronautical Society in 2016. This award is given annually and is the highest award bestowed by the AAS.

Meyerson was inspired by the Apollo program and also by launching model rockets as a child. For his 5th birthday, he received a cardboard mock-up of the Apollo Lunar Module and remembers playing inside of it. He later found the ingredients for rocket fuel in a cigar box that had been placed in the rafters of his childhood home by his two older brothers.

Quotations
"Competition is a good thing (…) It keeps you sharp and it keeps you focused."

“Having the opportunity to grow a team from 10 people to more than 1,200 has been a very proud accomplishment for me. Hiring them, motivating and challenging them, developing them into engineers and leaders, and then watching them accomplish historic achievements has been uniquely satisfying and very special.”

“Start with passion for mission. Has the candidate demonstrated his or her passion for working in the space field? This is foundational, so no amount of judgment, intelligence, or experience can overcome a lack of passion for our mission.”

References

American aerospace engineers
People in the space industry
Living people
University of Michigan College of Engineering alumni
Year of birth missing (living people)
University of Houston alumni
People from Southfield, Michigan
American aerospace businesspeople
American technology chief executives
NASA people
Blue Origin people
University of Michigan alumni
Southfield High School alumni
American company founders
American venture capitalists